Roundout was the first station built on the Ulster and Delaware Railroad (U&D).  The station was located on East Strand in Rondout, New York (now a section of Kingston), constructed in 1868, and demolished in the 1970s.

The station was on the site of the headquarters and maintenance facility of the U&D and was one of the busiest stations on the line.  The roundhouse and locomotive repair shops portions of the site are now the location of the Kingston Water Treatment plant. The remainder of the site is currently used by the Trolley Museum of New York.

External links
 Trolley Museum of New York

Railway stations in the Catskill Mountains
Former Ulster and Delaware Railroad stations
Railway stations in Ulster County, New York
Former railway stations in New York (state)